Vidas cruzadas may refer to:
Vidas cruzadas (1963 TV series), a Mexican telenovela
Vidas Cruzadas (webnovela), a 2009 series on Univision.com
List of Vidas Cruzadas episodes
, a 1929 play by Jacinto Benavente